Rosmarinus is a small taxonomic clade of woody, perennial herbs with fragrant evergreen needle-like leaves in the family Lamiaceae, native to the Mediterranean Basin.

In 2017 the species in the genus Rosmarinus were moved into the large genus Salvia based on taxonomic evidence. Thus Rosmarinus is no longer a genus, but still a monophyletic clade of species within Salvia.

Description
Salvia rosmarinus (rosemary), widespread in the Mediterranean region, and Salvia jordanii (formerly Rosmarinus eriocalyx), native to northwest Africa and southern Spain have long been widely recognized. Salvia granatensis (formerly Rosmarinus tomentosus) was first recognized as a separate species in 1941. Rosmarinus palaui was first described as a species in 2002, although recognition of this species remains controversial. Recent research has indicated that while S. granatensis forms a monophyletic group, this group is nested within a paraphyletic S. jordanii.

Rosemary can be propagated from seed or cuttings in summer, and can be spread by carelessly discarding garden waste.

Species
Species and nothospecies accepted by the Kew World Checklist

Natural hybrids

References

External links
 
 

Lamiaceae genera
Flora of Macaronesia
Flora of North Africa
Medicinal plants
Taxa named by Carl Linnaeus
Medicinal plants of Africa
Medicinal plants of Europe
Garden plants of Africa
Garden plants of Europe
Salvia